Mirabeh (also Romanized as Mīrābeh; also known as Garegeh, Gargahī, Gargeh’ī, and Gorkehī) is a village in Howmeh Rural District, in the Central District of Gilan-e Gharb County, Kermanshah Province, Iran. At the 2006 census, its population was 386, in 79 families.

References 

Populated places in Gilan-e Gharb County